Soyuz 9 (Union 9) was a June, 1970, Soviet crewed space flight. The two-man crew of Andriyan Nikolayev and Vitaly Sevastyanov broke the five-year-old space endurance record held by Gemini 7, with their nearly 18-day flight. The mission paved the way for the Salyut space station missions, investigating the effects of long-term weightlessness on crew, and evaluating the work that the cosmonauts could do in orbit, individually and as a team. It was also the last flight of the first-generation Soyuz 7K-OK spacecraft, as well as the first crewed space launch to be conducted at night. In 1970, Soyuz 9 marks the longest crewed flight by a solo spacecraft.

Crew

Backup crew

Reserve crew

Mission 
The flight tested, for a longer period of time than any other, the capacity of the hardware and the human crew, on the long-term exposure to space conditions and observing (both visually and photographically) geological and geographical objects, weather formations, water surfaces, and snow and ice covers. The crew conducted observations of celestial bodies and practiced astronavigation, by locking onto Vega or Canopus, and then used a sextant to measure its relation to the Earth horizon. The orbital elements were refined to three decimal places by the crew.

Commander Nikolayev and flight engineer Sevastyanov spent 18 days in space conducting various physiological and biomedical experiments on themselves, but also investigating the social implications of prolonged spaceflight. The cosmonauts spent time in two-way TV links with their families, watched matches in the 1970 FIFA World Cup, played chess with ground control, and voted in a Soviet election. The mission set a new space endurance record and marked a shift in emphasis away from spacefarers merely being able to exist in space for the duration of a long mission (such as the Apollo flights to the Moon) to being able to live in space. The mission took an unexpected physical toll on the cosmonauts; in order to conserve attitude control gas during the lengthy stay in orbit, Soyuz 9 was placed in a spin-stabilisation mode that made Nikolayev and Sevastyanov dizzy and space sick.

Mission parameters 
 Mass:  
 Perigee:  
 Apogee: 
 Inclination: 51.70°
 Period: 88.59 minutes

Chess game 

During the mission, the two cosmonauts played a game of chess against a pair of opponents on Earth: head of cosmonauts Nikolai Kamanin and fellow cosmonaut Viktor Gorbatko. It was the first documented game played by humans while in space. The set used aboard Soyuz 9 had pegs and grooves to keep the pieces in place and did not include magnets, which might have interfered with the spacecraft's systems.

The game began as a Queen's Gambit Accepted, with both players castling kingside.  Material was exchanged evenly throughout the game.  Toward the end of the game White checked Black four times, and rapid exchange of remaining pieces ensued.  At 35. Qxf6+, Black responded with the final move 35... Kg8 (the only legal move), moving the king to the flight square g8.  In the final position each side had a queen and five pawns, with no passed pawns.  The game concluded as a draw.

Sevastyanov was a chess enthusiast.  Following Soyuz 9, he served as president of the Soviet Chess Federation from 1977-1986 and 1988-1989.

Return 
The spacecraft soft landed in the steppes of Kazakhstan, and the crew was picked up immediately. Adjusting to gravity of Earth seemed to present a minor problem for the two cosmonauts. They required help exiting the descent module and were virtually unable to walk for a few days. Nonetheless, this experience proved the importance of providing crews with exercise equipment during missions. After landing the crew spent 2 weeks in a quarantine unit originally designed for cosmonauts returning from Moon landings. At the time the Soviet press reported that this was done to protect the cosmonauts in case space travel had weakened their immune systems. However, the quarantine process was likely practice for the Soviet crewed lunar program, which at that point had not been abandoned.

See also 

 Timeline of longest spaceflights

Notes

References 

Crewed Soyuz missions
1970 in the Soviet Union
Spacecraft launched in 1970
Spacecraft which reentered in 1970